There are many different keratin proteins normally expressed in the human integumentary system.  Mutations in keratin proteins in the skin can cause disease.

Of note, other structural proteins in the epidermis of the skin that are closely related to keratins may also cause disease if mutated.  Examples include:

Footnotes

See also 

 List of keratins expressed in the human integumentary system
 List of cutaneous conditions caused by problems with junctional proteins
 List of target antigens in pemphigoid
 List of target antigens in pemphigus
 Cutaneous conditions with immunofluorescence findings
 List of cutaneous conditions
 List of genes mutated in cutaneous conditions
 List of histologic stains that aid in diagnosis of cutaneous conditions
 Keratoderma

References 

 
 

Mutations in keratins
Dermatology-related lists